Santa Catarina is a state in the South Region of Brazil. Of Brazil's 26 states, it is the 7th smallest state in total area and the 11th most populous. Additionally, it is the 9th largest settlement, with 295 municipalities. The state, with 3.4% of the Brazilian population, generates 3.8% of the national GDP.

Santa Catarina is bordered by Paraná to the north, Rio Grande do Sul to the south, the Atlantic Ocean to the east, and the Argentine province of Misiones to the west. The coastline is over 450 km, i.e., about half of Portugal's mainland coast. The seat of the state executive, legislative and judiciary powers is the capital Florianópolis. Joinville, however, is the most populous city in the state. Besides Espírito Santo, Santa Catarina is the only state whose capital is not the most populous city. South of the Tropic of Capricorn, situated in the planet's southern temperate zone, the state has a humid subtropical climate (Cfa) in the east and west and an oceanic climate (Cfb) in the center. Climatic conditions vary according to the relief of the region: in the west and mountainous plateau, snow and frost are relatively frequent, while on the coast the climate is warmer, capable of reaching high temperatures in summer.

The territory of Santa Catarina is one of the oldest states in Brazil, separated from São Paulo in 1738, its first governor being José da Silva Pais. The state was created to extend Portuguese domains to southern Brazil until they reached the Rio de la Plata region. It is also the oldest state of the South Region of Brazil, older than Rio Grande do Sul (1807) and Paraná (1853). The state of Santa Catarina was settled by European immigrants: the coast was colonized by the Azorean Portuguese in the 18th century; the Itajaí Valley – a portion of the southern region and northern Santa Catarina – was settled by the Germans in the mid 19th century. The south of the state was populated by the Italians in the last years of the 19th century. Children and grandchildren of Italian and German immigrants who moved from Rio Grande do Sul settled in western Santa Catarina in the mid-20th century.

The state's social indicators are among the best in Brazil. It has the highest rate of life expectancy in the country (just like the Federal District), the lowest infant mortality rate and is also the state with the lowest economic inequality and illiteracy in Brazil. Santa Catarina has the 6th highest GDP in the country, with a diverse and industrialized economy.

Geography 

Santa Catarina is in a very strategic position in Mercosul, the South American Common Market. Its position in the map is situated between the parallel 25º57'41" and 29º23'55" of the Southern latitude and between the meridians 48º19'37" and 53º50'00" of Western longitude.

The Serra Geral mountains, a southern extension of the Serra do Mar, run north and south through the state parallel to the Atlantic coast, dividing the state into a narrow coastal plain and a larger plateau region to the west.

The Atlantic coast of Santa Catarina has many beaches, islands, bays, inlets, and lagoons.  The humid tropical Serra do Mar coastal forests cover the narrow coastal zone, which is crossed by numerous short streams from the wooded slopes of the Serras.

The central part of the state is home to the Araucaria moist forests, dominated by emergent Brazilian pines (Araucaria angustifolia).  The drainage of the plateau is westward to the Paraná River, the rivers being tributaries of the Iguaçu which forms its northern boundary, and of the Uruguay River which forms its southern boundary. The semi-deciduous Alto Paraná Atlantic forests occupy the westernmost valleys of the Iguaçu and Uruguay rivers.

The highest point of the state is the Morro da Boa Vista, at an altitude of 1,827 m, and the second-highest point is the Morro da Igreja, in the town of Urubici, at an altitude of 1,822 m.

Santa Catarina is one of the few Brazilian states with a negative deforestation index, meaning that forest coverage grows faster than it is chopped down, thanks to advances in agricultural technology that increase productivity while reducing the space needed.

History 

European settlement began with the Spanish settlement of Santa Catarina island in 1542.  The Portuguese took control in 1675 and established the captaincy of Santa Catarina in 1738, bringing families from the Azores to populate the shore.

In 1839, during the Ragamuffin War, there was an unsuccessful attempt for Santa Catarina to secede from the Empire of Brazil to form the independent Juliana Republic (allied with the Riograndense Republic to the south) which was thwarted in four months. Between the early 19th century and mid-20th century, a great number of European immigrants arrived in Santa Catarina; these immigrants were taken to populate the south of the nation by Imperial initiative. About 50% of these immigrants were from Germany and Austria. The rest came mainly from Italy, Poland, Russia, Ukraine, Netherlands, Norway, Sweden, Denmark, Luxembourg, Switzerland, Lithuania, France, Finland, Croatia, Serbia, Estonia, Slovenia and Latvia; these immigrants created an abundance of small, family-held farms, many of which continue to exist in the interior of the state.

Late in March 2004, the state was hit by the first hurricane ever recorded in the South Atlantic.  Because there is no naming system for such an event in Brazil, Brazilian meteorologists called it Hurricane Catarina, after the state.

Demographics

According to the IBGE of 2008, there were 6,091,000 people residing in the state.

Urbanization: 83% (2006); Population growth: 2% (1991–2000); Houses: 1,836,000 (2006).

The last PNAD (National Research for Sample of Domiciles) census revealed the following numbers: 5,297,000 White people (86.96%), 608,000 Brown (Multiracial) people (9.98%), 160,000 Black people (2.63%), 15,000 Asian people (0.25%), 5,000 Amerindian people (0.09%).

People of Portuguese ancestry, mostly Azoreans, predominate on the coast. People of German descent predominate in the northeast region (Itajaí Valley) and in the north (Joinville region). There are many German communities in the west. People of Italian descent predominate in the south and many areas in the west. People of African, Amerindian, or Japanese origin are present in small communities in a few towns.

According to a 2013 genetic study with 20 samples (for 6.7 million people), the population of Santa Catarina is made up of 79.7% European, 11.4% African and 8.9% Amerindian ancestry groups. A genetic study found out an isolated Azorean-Brazilian community from Santa Catarina to have between 80.6% to 93.5% European descent, along with 12.6% to 6.8% African and 4.1% to 2.4% Native American ancestries.

European settlement

One of the Brazilian states with the most obvious signs of 19th-century European immigration, Santa Catarina, where the vast majority of the population descends from European settlers, is also the state with the highest percentage of European phenotype citizens.

The state is also famous for having towns where most of the population belongs to a single main ancestry thanks to the settlement program with European colonists. Here are a few examples of such towns in the Southern region:

Over 50% of Santa Catarina's population has German, Austrian and Luxembourgish ancestry (the local Hunsrückisch is known as Katharinensisch, East Pomeranian is still spoken in the town of Pomerode and Southern Austro-Bavarian by the Tyrolean population in Treze Tílias. It was also the main destination for Danes in Brazil, being sparsely populated and with just its shore mainly inhabited by Azoreans in the 18th century (e.g. Laguna born Anita Garibaldi, wife and comrade-in-arms of Italian Unification revolutionary Giuseppe Garibaldi). It also received Italians, French, Swedes, Norwegians, Swiss, Lithuanians and Latvians, Estonians, Finns, Poles, Slovenians, Croatians, Belgians, American Confederates and Spaniards who populated its interior during the 19th century. The town of Brusque, founded by Austrian Baron von Schneeburg who brought in German families from the Grand Duchy of Baden to settle in the northeast of Santa Catarina, also received additional waves of Italians from the Tyrol–South Tyrol–Trentino Euroregion, Poles and Swedes. Brusque was also one of the destinations in the South and Southeast for American Confederate settlers in 1867, differing from São Paulo and Paraná colonies, who gave birth to new towns such as Americana in São Paulo. Neighboring towns such as Nova Trento founded in 1875, similarly received subjects from the Austro-Hungarian Empire because Italian-speaking Tyroleans known as trentinos and Germans from the Kingdom of Prussia, historic Swabia and Baden faced an immense crisis in the agricultural sector caused by the conflicts of the unification of Italy and Germany respectively, that weakened local trade. Istrian Italians under the Austrian Empire rule also fled Istria to settle in Brazil, and a few towns like Nova Veneza, founded in 1891, still have an over 90% Venetian population of which many still speak the Talian dialect. Most Venetians arrived after the Third Italian War of Independence in 1866, when Venice, along with the rest of the Veneto, became part of the newly created Kingdom of Italy.

Portuguese

The Portuguese started arriving in the 1750s, mainly from the Azores islands, and colonized the coast. In the late 18th century, half of Santa Catarina's population was Portuguese-born. These Portuguese established many important towns in the state, such as Florianópolis, the capital.

Germans and Austrians

 
German people started arriving in 1828, after Brazilian independence. They were peasants attracted by the opportunity to have their own land, as Germanic countries were overpopulated and many people had no land to work. German immigration was very low until the 1850s when waves started arriving in southern Brazil. To stimulate the German colonization of southern Brazil, the Brazilian government created many German colonies: these were ethnically Germanic areas where people from many parts of what are now Germany, Austria, the Czech Republic, and Poland settled. Initially, these colonies were in rural areas, where immigrants were able to cultivate their own farms. Many of these German colonies developed into large cities, Joinville and Blumenau among them.

Germans were isolated in rural communities for decades.  They did not have much contact with the other peoples of Brazil, and for generations, they were able to speak the German language and maintain German traditions in Brazil. This situation changed in 1942, during World War II, when Brazil declared war on Germany, and German immigrants and their descendants were required to learn Portuguese and to culturally integrate into their respective states.

German influence in the state nevertheless remains very strong and visible.  Many towns and cities retain notable aspects of German culture: in Pomerode, for example, a small town in which nine-tenths of the population is of German-Brazilian descent, most inhabitants still speak German fluently; Oktoberfest continues to be celebrated in Blumenau and in many other towns in the region.  Architecture, too, shows German influence, as do popular customs and local cuisine.

Italians

Italian settlers started arriving in Santa Catarina in 1875 and immigrated in large numbers until the 1910s.  They were peasants from Northern Italy and established themselves in ethnically Italian colonies close to the coast.  In the beginning, Italian settlements failed, because many Italians died of tropical diseases or left the colonies in search of better conditions. However, in the Vale do Tubarão region (southern Santa Catarina), Italian immigrants found cooler weather and better lands, and the settlements prospered.  Many of them worked in the coal industry and, unlike the German immigrants, they did not focus much on agriculture, except in places like Vale do Itajaí, where Northern Italians worked together with Germans.

Minority languages

The minority languages of the state of Santa Catarina can be divided into two distinct groups:
 Autoctone Languages or Indigenous Languages: Kaingang; Guaraní;
 Extoctone Languages or Immigration Languages: German (Hunsrückisch, Dutch, East Pomeranian, Plautdietsch, Austro-Bavarian, including more specifically Southern Austro-Bavarian); Italian (Talian or Venetian), Slavic (Polish, Ukrainian, Russian) and others, including Scandinavian (Norwegian, Swedish and Danish), Lithuanian, Yiddish, English and Japanese minorities.

In some cities and villages, German or Talian are still the main spoken languages and enjoy co-official status.

Religion

According to the 2010 population census, the population of Santa Catarina is made up of Roman Catholics (73.07%); Protestants or evangelicals (20.4%); spiritists (1.58%); Jehovah's Witnesses (0.74%); Mormons (0.11%) Brazilian Catholic Apostolic Church (0.17%); Buddhists (0.05%); new Eastern religious (0.04%), among which the Messianic constitute 0.03%; Islamic (0.01%); Orthodox Christians (0.07%); umbandistas (0.14%); Jewish (0.02%); spiritualists (0.03%); esoteric traditions (0.17%); indigenous (0.03%); candomblezeiros (0.09%) and Hindus (0.01%). Another 3.27% had no religion, including atheists (0.29%) and agnostics (0.6%); 0.29% followed other Christian religions; 0.21% had no determined faith; 0.04% did not know, 0.04% other Eastern religions and 0.03% did not declare.

Education

Portuguese is the official national language, and thus the primary language taught in schools. English, Spanish, and sometimes German are part of the official high school curriculum.

There are more than 105 universities in the state of Santa Catarina.

Colleges and Universities

 Universidade Federal de Santa Catarina (UFSC) (Federal University of Santa Catarina) (Public);
 Universidade Federal da Fronteira Sul (UFFS) (Federal University of the Southern Border)(Public);
 Universidade do Estado de Santa Catarina (UDESC) (University of the State of Santa Catarina) (Public);
 Instituto Federal de Santa Catarina (IFSC) (Federal Institute of Santa Catarina) (Public);
 Instituto Federal Catarinense (IFC) (Santa Catarina's Federal Institute) (Public);
 Fundação Universidade Regional de Blumenau (FURB) (Regional University Foundation of Blumenau) (Public, but paid);
 Universidade do Sul de Santa Catarina (UNISUL) (University of Southern Santa Catarina) (Private);
 Universidade do Vale do Itajaí (UNIVALI) (University of the Itajaí Valley) (Private);
 Universidade da Região de Joinville (UNIVILLE) (University of the Region of Joinville) (Private);
Universidade para o Desenvolvimento do Alto Vale do Itajaí (UNIDAVI) (University for the development of the upper valley of the Itajaí) (Private);
 Centro Universitário Leonardo da Vinci (UNIASSELVI) (University Center Leonardo da Vinci) (Private);
 Universidade Católica de Santa Catarina (Catholic University of Santa Catarina) (Private);
 Universidade do Contestado (UnC) (University of Contestado) (Private);
 Universidade do Oeste de Santa Catarina (Unoesc) (University of Western Santa Catarina) (Private);
 Universidade do Planalto de Santa Catarina (Uniplac) (University of the Plateau of Santa Catarina) (Private);
 Universidade do Extremo Sul Catarinense (Unesc) (University of Southernmost Santa Catarina) (Private);
 Sociedade Educacional de Santa Catarina (SOCIESC) (Educational Society for Santa Catarina)(Private);

Economy
The industrial sector is the largest contributor to the GDP at 52.5%, followed by the service sector at 33.9%. Agriculture represents 13.6% of GDP (2004). Santa Catarina exports include aviculture 26.1%, wood products 15.4%, compressors 8.5%, cotton 6.8%, and vehicles 5.8% (2002). Its share of the Brazilian economy stood at 4% in 2005.

Santa Catarina has one of the highest standards of living in Brazil and is a major industrial and agricultural center. The capital city, Florianópolis, has a diversified economy, being an important location for the technology industry and a major tourist destination. Commerce and services are also very strong in the capital. Cities in Florianópolis metro area, like São José, Palhoça, and Biguaçu are important and diverse industrial centers, as well as strong commercial areas. In the northeast of the state, electric-mechanical, textile and furniture industries are strong; in the west, cattle and poultry breeding predominate, while in the south it is ceramics and shellfish. The corridor between Joinville, Jaraguá do Sul and Blumenau is heavily industrialized – more than 50% of the state's industrial output is concentrated in this small, but highly developed area.

In agriculture, the state stands out in the production of rice, apple and onion, in addition to significant production of soy, maize, banana, grape, garlic, barley, wheat and yerba mate.

With only 1.12% of the national territory, Santa Catarina was the 8th largest producer of maize and the 11th largest producer of soybeans in Brazil, in the year 2017. When production per unit area is considered, the State becomes the national leader in corn, with an average of 8.1 thousand kilos per hectare, and second in soybeans, with 3.580 kilos per hectare. In 15 years, there has been a 118% growth in corn productivity and 58% in soybean. In 2019, corn production in the state reached 2.8 million tons (in 2018, Brazil was the 3rd largest producer in the world, with 82 million tons. However, the annual demand for corn in the state is 7 million tons – 97% is for animal consumption, especially for pigs and broilers (83.8%), as Santa Catarina has the largest pig population among Brazilian states and the second largest in poultry. The corn deficit is covered by interstate imports, mainly from Mato Grosso do Sul, Mato Grosso, Paraná and Goiás, and from countries like Argentina and Paraguay. In soy production, in 2019 the state harvested 2.3 million tons (Brazil produced 116 million tons this year, being the largest producer in the world).

The state was the 2nd largest rice producer in the country in 2020, second only to the Rio Grande do Sul, harvesting around 1.1 million tons of the product. Total national production was 10.5 million tons this year.

The three Southern States of the country are responsible for 95% of the national apple production, and Santa Catarina tops, competing with the Rio Grande do Sul. The São Joaquim region is responsible for 35% of the apple planting.

Santa Catarina is also a national leader in the production of onions. In 2017, it produced 630 thousand tons, especially in the municipalities of Alfredo Wagner, Angelina and Rancho Queimado.

In banana production, Santa Catarina was the 4th largest national producer in 2018.

Santa Catarina was the third largest producer of garlic in Brazil in 2018, with a planted area of approximately two thousand hectares. The Curitibanos region is the largest producer in the state.

Santa Catarina is one of the few states in the country that cultivate barley. In the 2007–2011 period, the state had 2.5% of national production. The cultivation was concentrated in the microregions of Canoinhas (57.6%), Curitibanos (26.5%) and Xanxerê (11.5%). It's also one of the few states that cultivate wheat, due to its favourable climate. In 2019 the estimated production of the state was 150 thousand tons, still small compared to the 2.3 million tons produced by both Rio Grande do Sul and Paraná. Since the country has to import these 2 cereals in high volume every year, the State has been trying to stimulate the production of winter grain crops with incentive programs.

Santa Catarina produced close to 100 thousand tons of yerba mate in 2018, mainly in the cities of Chapecó and Canoinhas.

The state had an annual production of about 23 thousand tons of grapes in 2019, with 86% of the state production located in the municipalities of Caçador, Pinheiro Preto, Tangará and Videira. Most of the national production, however, is located in Rio Grande do Sul (664.2 thousand tons in 2018).

Santa Catarina is the largest producer of pork in Brazil. The State is responsible for 28.38% of the country's slaughter and 40.28% of Brazilian pork exports. The number of pigs in Brazil was 41.1 million in 2017. Santa Catarina had 19.7% of the total.

The number of chickens in Brazil was 1.4 billion in 2017. Santa Catarina had 10.8% of the national total, the 4th largest in the country.

Brazil is the fifth largest milk producer in the world, having produced almost 34 billion liters in 2018, 4% of world production. Santa Catarina was responsible for 8.78% of the national production, almost 3 billion liters of milk. In the production of chicken eggs, Santa Catarina represented 4.58% of the national total, which was 3.6 billion dozens in 2018. The State alone was responsible for 165 million dozens.

In cattle raising, Brazil had almost 215 million head in 2017. Santa Catarina had about 5 million head of cattle in 2018.

Santa Catarina was the 5th largest honey producer in the country in 2017, with 10.2% of the national total.

Fishing plays an important role in the state's economy. The production of oysters, scallops, and mussels in Brazil was 20.9 thousand tons in 2017. Santa Catarina was the main producer, responsible for 98.1%. Palhoça, Florianópolis and Bombinhas led the ranking of municipalities.

Santa Catarina is the largest coal producer in Brazil, mainly in Criciúma city and its surroundings. The production of crude mineral coal in Brazil was 13.6 million tons in 2007. Santa Catarina produced 8.7 Mt (million tons); the Rio Grande do Sul, 4.5 Mt; and Paraná, 0.4 Mt. Despite the extraction of mineral coal in Brazil, the country still needs to import about 50% of the coal consumed, as the coal produced in the country is of low quality, with a lower concentration of carbon. Brazil's coal reserves are 32 billion tons and are mainly in the Rio Grande do Sul (89.25% of the total), followed by Santa Catarina (10.41%). The Candiota Deposit (RS) alone has 38% of all national coal. As it is the coal of inferior quality, it is used only in the generation of thermoelectric energy and at the site of the deposit. The oil crisis in the 1970s led the Brazilian government to create the Energy Mobilization Plan, with intense efforts to discover new coal reserves. The Geological Survey of Brazil, through works carried out in the Rio Grande, do Sul and Santa Catarina greatly increased the reserves of coal previously known, between 1970 and 1986 (mainly between 1978 and 1983). In 2011, coal accounted for only 5.6% of the energy consumed in Brazil, but it is a strategic alternate source that can be activated when, for example, low water levels in dams reduce hydroelectric power generation. This happened in 2013, when several thermoelectric plants were shut down, to maintain the necessary supply, albeit at a higher cost.

Santa Catarina had an industrial GDP of R $63.2 billion in 2017, equivalent to 5.3% of the national industry. It employs 761,072 workers in the industry. The main sectors are Construction (17.9%), Food (15.9%), Clothing (7.4%), Industrial Public Utility Services, such as Electricity and Water (6.9%), and Textiles (6.0%). These 5 sectors constitute 54.1% of the state's industry.

The main industrial centers in Santa Catarina are Jaraguá do Sul, Joinville, Chapecó and Blumenau. The first is diversified, with factories of fabrics, food products, foundries, and the mechanical industry. Chapecó's economy is based on agribusiness. Blumenau concentrates on the textile industry (together with Gaspar and Brusque) and recently also on software. In the interior of the state, there are numerous small manufacturing centers, linked to both the use of wood in industry and the processing of agricultural and pastoral products.

In Textile industry, Santa Catarina stands out. Brazil, despite being among the 5 largest producers in the world in 2013, and a large consumer of textile and clothing, do not participate proportionately in global trade. In 2015, Brazilian imports ranked 25th (US$5.5 billion), and in exports, it was only 40th in the world. At 0.3% market share in the global textile and clothing trade, Brazil is constrained by uncompetitive pricing compared to producers in China and India. The gross value of production, which includes consumption of intermediate goods and services, by the Brazilian textile industry, corresponds to almost R $40 billion in 2015, 1.6% of the gross value of Industrial Production in Brazil. The South has 32.65% of production, Among the main textile clusters in Brazil, the Vale do Itajaí (SC) stand out. In 2015, Santa Catarina was the 2nd largest textile and clothing employer in Brazil. It led in the manufacture of pillows and is the largest producer in Latin America and the second in the world in woven labels. It is the largest exporter in the country of toilet/kitchen clothes, cotton terry cloth fabrics, and cotton knit shirts. Some of the most famous companies in the region are Hering, Malwee, Karsten and Haco.

In Food industry, Brazil was the 2nd largest exporter of processed foods in the world in 2019, with a value of U $34.1 billion in exports. The Brazilian food and beverage industry's revenue in 2019 was R $699.9 billion, 9.7% of the country's Gross Domestic Product. In 2015, the industrial food and beverage sector in Brazil comprised 34,800 companies (not counting bakeries), the vast majority of which were small. These companies employed more than 1,600,000 workers, making the food and beverage industry the largest employer in the manufacturing industry. There are around 570 large companies in Brazil, which constitute a major proportion of industry revenues. Companies such as Sadia and Perdigão (which later merged into BRF), Seara Alimentos (which today belongs to JBS), Aurora (all meat specialists), Gomes da Costa (fish and canned), Eisenbahn Brewery and Hemmer Alimentos (specialist in preserves such as cucumber, beet, heart of palm, among others) are based in Santa Catarina.

In the automotive sector, the state has GM and BMW plants.

The wood and paper industry is concentrated in (Canoinhas, Três Barras and Mafra) in the north of Santa Catarina, due to raw material availability in the region. In the Serra industries (Rio Negrinho and São Bento do Sul), wood processing works are carried out, producing various derivatives and final products. The state stands out nationally in the production of wooden furniture. Most companies in this sector are based in these cities, together with Palhoça. The state's industry accounts for 7.5% of the national sector. The state is the second-largest furniture exporter in the country (2014). The Santa Catarina timber industry stands out with a 17.1% share in Brazil. It is among the largest in the country in the production of wooden doors and is a national leader in frames.

Responsible for handling R$6.5 billion in gross value of the Industrial Production of Santa Catarina, the paper and cellulose sector is one of the most important economic vocations in the mountainous part of the state. The sector is 8th in exports and 10th in job creation in Santa Catarina, with more than 20.2 thousand vacancies, according to data from 2015. The municipalities of Lages and Otacílio Costa together represent about 47% of the exports of the Pulp and Paper sector State role.

Brazil's ceramic tile factories are mainly based in the south of Santa Catarina (including the cities of Imbituba, Tubarão, Criciúma, Forquilhinha, Içara and Urussanga). The state of Santa Catarina also leads the country in the production of crockery and crystals.

The northeast of the state is notable for the production of moto-compressors, auto parts, refrigerators, engines and electrical components, industrial machines, tubes, and connections. Its compressor production makes it a leader in exports among Brazil's states. It is also an important producer of forestry equipment. In metallurgy, the state has the largest national manufacturer of stainless steel sinks, vats, and tanks, trophies, and medals, fixing elements (screws, nuts, etc.), jacketed tanks for fuels, industrial pressure vessels, and malleable iron connections. It is a world leader in engine blocks and iron heads, being Brazil's largest exporter of this product.

In the leather-footwear sector (Footwear industry),the state has a production center in São João Batista.

In the household appliances industry, sales of white goods (refrigerators, air conditioning, and others) were 12.9 million units in 2017. The sector had its peak in 2012, with 18.9 million units. The brands that sold the most were Brastemp, Electrolux, Consul and Philips. Consul is originally from Santa Catarina, having merged with Brastemp and is now a part of the multinational Whirlpool Corporation.

The major cities and their respective fields are:

 Florianópolis, technology; tourism; services; commerce; government; education.
 Joinville, metal-mechanic; automobile; tourism/events; software development; commerce; plastic; textile; chemistry; education.
 Blumenau, textile; software; commerce and beer.
 São José, industry; commerce and services.
 Criciúma, ceramics.
 Chapecó, cattle and poultry breeding.
 Lages tourism and wood industry.
 Itajai, seaport.
 Jaraguá do Sul, electric motors and textile.
 Palhoça, industry.
 Balneário Camboriú, tourism; commerce.
 Tubarão, ceramics
 Brusque, textile.
 Rio Negrinho, furniture.
 Caçador, furniture; metal-mechanics; agribusiness.
 Campos Novos, agribusiness.
 Concórdia, Swine industry.
 Curitibanos, Agribusiness, wood industry, education.
 São Joaquim, tourism.

Statistics
Vehicles: 2,489,343 (March/2007);
Mobile phones: 3.7 million (April/2007); Telephones: 1.6 million (April/2007). Cities: 293 (2007).

Infrastructure

Roads

In 2019, Santa Catarina had 62,871 km of highways, 9,321 km of which were paved, and of these, 556 km were duplicated highways.

The main highway is the BR-101, which is fully duplicated, passing along the coast, where most of the 25 cities in the state of Santa Catarina with the highest GDP are located. Other major highways in the state are BR-470 and BR-280, which are currently undergoing duplication works, BR-116, BR-282, BR-153 and BR-158.

International Airport

Florianópolis is served by Hercílio Luz International Airport for both domestic and international flights.  The traffic has grown significantly and in October 2019, a new airport was opened to serve 2.7 million passengers a year.
The architectural design of the new airport was chosen by a public competition held by Infraero in partnership with the Brazilian Architects Institute (IAB). Among the over 150 original entries, the proposal of São Paulo architect Mário Bizelli was chosen. The construction work will be tendered in 2005 and should be finished in two years.

Ports

The state has five specialized ports — Itajaí, São Francisco do Sul, Itapoá, Imbituba and Navegantes — the first two being of great importance. São Francisco do Sul is a major exporter of soy, wood and cellulose, and importer of steel material, such as steel bars and coils, in addition to fertilizers and urea. Itajaí exports a lot of chicken, wood and meat products and imports mechanical and electronic products, chemicals and miscellaneous textiles. Imbituba represents a coal terminal and Laguna, a fishing port. Itajaí had a cargo movement of 18.9 million tons in 2021, and São Francisco do Sul, 13.6 million, being among the 10 largest in the country.

Tourism

Santa Catarina offers several destinations and events throughout the year: rural tourism, thermal resorts, ecological tourism, and adventure sports, historic monuments and sights, religious tourism, Beto Carrero World and Unipraias parks in Balneário Camboriú, and beach resorts of Florianópolis, Laguna, Porto Belo and Itajaí.

Some of these sights can only be seen in the off-season, like the snow on the Catarinense Mountain Range – one of the places in Brazil where it snows every year.

Between July and November, southern right whales visit the state's coast. The municipality of Timbó is a center for adventure sports like rafting and canyoning.

The popular festivities take place in October. The Oktoberfest of Blumenau is Brazil's largest and the world's second largest (after Germany's Munich).

Joinville is the host city in July to the widely acclaimed "Joinville Dance Festival", the annual "Festival of Flowers" in November which showcases orchids produced in the region, and several business events in its Convention Center.

Florianópolis, the city/island State Capital attracts a large number of tourists during the summer months who visit its 42 beaches.

There are also many smaller resort towns, including the capital of the microlight aircraft tour flights Itapema, Piçarras, Barra Velha, and Penha, home to the famous amusement park Beto Carrero World.

An interesting collaboration between humans and wildlife has developed in Laguna (birthplace of Anita Garibaldi, the wife and comrade-in-arms of Italian Unification revolutionary Giuseppe Garibaldi): a pod of bottlenose dolphins drive fish towards fishermen who stand at the beach in shallow waters. Then one dolphin rolls over, which the fishermen take as a sign to cast their nets. The dolphins feed on the escaping fish. The dolphins were not trained for this behavior; the collaboration has been reported since 1847. Southern right whales also can be seen in Laguna from the shore during the winter to spring seasons.

The  Turvo State Park, created in 1947, is in the northwest of the state.
It contains the Yucumã Falls, a dramatic waterfall on the Uruguay River on the Argentinian border.

Sports
In the state of Santa Catarina, important athletes were born such as: Gustavo Kuerten, the greatest male tennis player in the country's history; Pedro Barros, one of the most important skaters in the country along with Bob Burnquist; Darlan Romani, world champion in shot put, Tiago Splitter, NBA champion, Fernando Scherer, Olympic medalist and world champion in swimming, and Ana Moser, Olympic medalist in volleyball.

Football

The major football clubs of Santa Catarina are:

Criciuma EC from Criciúma. Criciúma EC, also known as "Tigre" (Tiger), was champion in the Copa do Brasil (Brazilian Cup) in 1991, the most important championship won by a Santa Catarina team in a very long time. Criciúma is the only team from Santa Catarina that played Libertadores of America Cup, in 1992, when it was 5th. Criciúma also won the Brazilian 2002 second series and 2006 C series.  Criciuma is currently playing Campeonato Brasileiro Série B, the Brazilian national second division.

Figueirense FC black and white from Florianópolis.  Its nicknames are Figueira (Fig tree) and O Furacão do Estreito (The Hurricane of Estreito).  Its stadium is the Orlando Scarpelli, located in the Estreito neighborhood in the mainland part of the city.  Figueirense is currently playing in the Campeonato Brasileiro Série B, the second division of Brazilian football.

Avaí FC, blue and white from Florianópolis.  It is also known as O Leão da Ilha (The Lion of the Island).  Its stadium is the Aderbal Ramos da Silva, popularly known as Ressacada, located in the Carianos neighborhood, in the south part of the island.  Avaí is currently playing in Campeonato Brasileiro Série B, the second division of Brazilian football.

Joinville Esporte Clube from Joinville. It is also known as "Tricolor" or "JEC". JEC won the Campeonato Brasileiro Série B, the second division of Brazilian football, in 2014 and was promoted to the Campeonato Brasileiro Série A, the first division, but currently plays in Campeonato Brasileiro Série C, the third division, after two consecutive relegations.

Associação Chapecoense de Futebol from Chapecó. Chapecoense is playing in the Campeonato Brasileiro Série A, the first and major division of Brazilian football. The club is currently recovering from the loss of virtually all of its first team in a 2016 plane crash.

Surfing

Campeche Beach is generally considered to have the best and most consistent waves in Brazil, and in April of each year hosts what is currently South America's only ASP (Association of Surfing Professionals) World Championship Tour professional surfing competition.  Brazil has played host to many ASP tour events over the past 30 years. Former contest sites include Rio de Janeiro, Barra de Tijuca, and Saquarema, but the past four years have seen the tour set up shop in Florianópolis. Previously held towards the end of the tour, the past few years have seen several ASP world champions crowned in Brazil. In 2004 it was Andy Irons, and in 2005 it was Kelly Slater (who had his 2006 ASP World Title already stitched up by Brazil).

See also
 Hino do Estado de Santa Catarina
 List of cities in Brazil (all cities and municipalities)

Notes

External links

 Official State of Santa Catarina website 
 Santa Catarina on YouTube 
 Guia Catarina – Guia de informações sobre Santa Catarina 
 Informações sobre as Cidades de Santa Catarina, Eventos, e Diretório de empresas 
 Bela Santa Catarina 

 

States of Brazil